The 1981 US Open was a tennis tournament played on outdoor hard courts at the USTA National Tennis Center in New York City, United States. It was the 101st edition of the US Open and was held from September 1 to September 13, 1981.

Seniors

Men's singles

 John McEnroe defeated  Björn Borg 4–6, 6–2, 6–4, 6–3
 It was McEnroe's 4th career Grand Slam title and his 3rd US Open title.

Women's singles

 Tracy Austin defeated  Martina Navratilova 1–6, 7–6(7–4), 7–6(7–1)
 It was Austin's 2nd and last career Grand Slam title and her 2nd US Open title.

Men's doubles

 Peter Fleming /  John McEnroe  defeated  Heinz Günthardt /  Peter McNamara by walkover
 It was Fleming's 4th career Grand Slam title and his 2nd US Open title. It was McEnroe's 9th career Grand Slam title and his 4th US Open title.

Women's doubles

 Kathy Jordan /  Anne Smith defeated  Rosemary Casals /  Wendy Turnbull 6–3, 6–3
 It was Jordan's 3rd career Grand Slam title and her only US Open title. It was Smith's 4th career Grand Slam title and her 1st US Open title.

Mixed doubles

 Anne Smith /  Kevin Curren defeated  JoAnne Russell /  Steve Denton 6–4, 7–6(7–4)
 It was Smith's 5th career Grand Slam title and her 2nd US Open title. It was Curren's 1st career Grand Slam title and his 1st US Open title.

Juniors

Boys' singles

 Thomas Högstedt defeated  Hans Schwaier 7–5, 6–3

Girls' singles

 Zina Garrison defeated  Kate Gompert 6–0, 6–3

External links
 Official US Open website

 
 

 
US Open
US Open (tennis) by year
US Open
US Open
US Open